David A. Scholz (April 12, 1948 – December 5, 2015) was an American basketball player.

Scholz was born in 1948. He attended Stephen Decatur High School in Decatur, Illinois. He was selected by the Associated Press (AP) to the All-Illinois high school basketball team in March 1965. He also led Decatur to the Elite Eight of the state tournament his junior and senior seasons. 

He then enrolled at the University of Illinois. He became a starter for the Illinois men's basketball team in December 1966, scoring 22 points in his first start. He was also a two-time, first-team All-Big-10 selection and an AP All-American third-team selection. In March 1969, he became the leading scorer in the history of Illinois basketball.

Scholz was taken with the thirteenth pick in the fourth round of the 1969 NBA Draft by the Philadelphia 76ers. He played in one game for the 76ers, recording two points. Scholz later resided in Nashville, Tennessee. He died in 2015 at age 67.

References

1948 births
2015 deaths
All-American college men's basketball players
American men's basketball players
Basketball players from Illinois
Forwards (basketball)
Hamden Bics players
Illinois Fighting Illini men's basketball players
Philadelphia 76ers draft picks
Philadelphia 76ers players